The Aston Martin Asia Cup (AMAC) is the world's first ever Aston Martin one make series. All drivers will compete for the AMAC title in identical Aston Martin V8 Vantage N24 race cars.

The series started in 2008 and consisted of 10 races throughout the Asia Pacific region including China, Japan, Malaysia and Singapore. Each race features a grid of 15 Aston Martin Vantage N24s, a 4.3 litre race-developed evolution of the V8 Vantage.

The AMAC includes a variety of 30-minute sprint races and longer endurance races, some of which support Formula One events in the region, like the Singapore Grand Prix and the Chinese Grand Prix.

Race Car
The V8 Vantage has a V8 engine producing 410 bhp and weighs just 1350 kg. The 18 AMAC cars have the automated manual Sportshift transmission, and all the cars are equipped with roll cages, safety fuel tanks, race seats and harnesses, and fire extinguisher systems. The cars will be serviced at the Aston Martin Beijing service facility at the city's Goldenport race circuit. Michelin is the sole tyre supplier.

Prize
The Championship offers a fully sponsored season in a Vantage N24 in the 2009 FIA GT4 Championship for the winner.

Circuits visited
The inaugural season in 2008 had 10 rounds, and saw the series visit the following circuits:

 Shanghai International Circuit, China
 Sepang International Circuit, Malaysia
 Marina Bay Street Circuit, Singapore
 Zhuhai International Circuit, China

Series champions

References

External links
 
 2008 standings – driverdb.com

One-make series
Asia Cup
Sports car racing series
Recurring sporting events established in 2007
Recurring sporting events disestablished in 2009
Defunct auto racing series